All Saints Church, Hoole, is in Hoole Road, Hoole, Chester, Cheshire, England.  It is an active Anglican parish church in the deanery of Chester, the archdeaconry of Chester and the diocese of Chester, and is recorded in the National Heritage List for England as a designated Grade II listed building.

History

The church was built in 1867 to a design by S. W. Dawkes.  In 1911 a vestry was added.  The following year the south aisle was built; it was designed by John Douglas in collaboration with F. (or J.) Walley, but not completed until after Douglas' death.  The furnishing of the church was reordered in the later part of the 20th century by Graham Holland.

Architecture
The church is built in red sandstone with grey-green slate roofs.  Its plan consists of a five-bay nave with north and south aisles, all under separate roofs, a chancel, a southwest tower with a broach spire, a flat roofed vestry at the southeast, and a north porch with a gable.  The windows have plate tracery.

See also

Grade II listed buildings in Chester (north and west)
List of church restorations, amendments and furniture by John Douglas

References

Churches completed in 1867
Churches completed in 1912
Church of England church buildings in Cheshire
Grade II listed churches in Cheshire
Gothic Revival church buildings in England
Gothic Revival architecture in Cheshire
John Douglas buildings
Diocese of Chester
19th-century Church of England church buildings
1867 establishments in England
Grade II listed buildings in Chester
Churches in Chester